Charanjeet Singh (born 15 June 1993) is an Italian cricketer. He played for the Italy national cricket team in the 2016 ICC World Cricket League Division Four tournament in October 2016.

In May 2019, he was named in Italy's squad for their Twenty20 International (T20I) series against Germany in the Netherlands. The same month, he was named in Italy's squad for the Regional Finals of the 2018–19 ICC T20 World Cup Europe Qualifier tournament in Guernsey. He made his Twenty20 International (T20I) debut for Italy, against Guernsey, on 16 June 2019.

References

External links
 

1993 births
Living people
Italian cricketers
Indian emigrants to Italy
Italy Twenty20 International cricketers
Place of birth missing (living people)